The Summer of Sir Lancelot is a 1963 comedy novel by the British writer Richard Gordon. The fearsome surgeon Sir Lancelot Spratt goes into retirement, committed to spending his time trout fishing. However the antics of his niece Euphemia and a dispute over fishing rights soon disturb his peace.

References

Bibliography
 Pringle, David. Imaginary People: A Who's who of Fictional Characters from the Eighteenth Century to the Present Day. Scolar Press, 1996.

1963 British novels
Novels by Richard Gordon
Comedy novels
Heinemann (publisher) books